Bates White LLC. is a privately held economic consulting firm specializing in advanced economic, financial, and econometric analysis. The firm was founded in 1999 and currently has one office in Washington, D.C., with about 250 employees. The firm provides economic consulting and expert testimony.

Awards 
Bates White is consistently recognized by the following organizations:

 Global Competition Review has included Bates White in its annual "Economics 20" for top antitrust and competition economics consultancies every year since 2009.
 Who’s Who Legal: Competition includes many Partners each year on its list; a number of Partners are also named a Global Thought leaders.
 Vault consistently ranks Bates White in several categories, including Best Consulting Internship and Top 50 Consulting.
 The Washington Post has recognized Bates White in its Top Workplaces for mid-size companies in Washington, DC, for seven consecutive years.

Practice areas 
Bates White's expertise spans the following practice areas:
 Alternative Investments
 Antitrust and Competition
 Bankruptcy and Restructuring
 Class Action
 Communications and Media
 Consumer Protection
 Data Science and Statistics
 Energy
 Environmental and Product Liability
 Finance
 Healthcare
 Intellectual Property
 International Arbitration
 Labor and Employment 
 Life Sciences
 Public Policy and Regulatory Economics 
 Transfer Pricing and Tax

Further reading from Bates White 
 Chapters in The Antitrust Revolution, 7th edition (2018)
 Chapters in The Oxford Handbook of International Antitrust Economics (2014)
 The Economics of Collusion: Cartels and Bidding Rings by Robert C. Marshall and Leslie M. Marx (2012)
 “Plus Factors and Agreement in Antitrust Law,” Michigan Law Review by Robert C. Marshall, Leslie M. Marx, Halbert L. White, and William E. Kovacic (2011)

See also 
 Economic consulting
 Analysis Group
 Berkeley Research Group
 Brattle Group
 Charles River Associates
 Compass Lexecon
 Cornerstone Research
 Edgeworth Economics
 NERA Economic Consulting

References 

1999 establishments in Washington, D.C.
Consulting firms established in 1999
Macroeconomics consulting firms
Privately held companies based in Washington, D.C.